The Fish is a passenger train that operates over the Blue Mountains between Lithgow and Sydney, Australia.

In the 19th century a train from Sydney to Penrith was driven by John Herron, a large man with the nickname of The Big Fish. The name transferred to the train itself and it remains in use today. The name has been applied to various Blue Mountains services over the years and today is a commuter service from Lithgow to Sydney operated by V sets.

Following electrification of the Main Western line in 1958, it was operated by U set single-deck electric trains. These in turn were replaced by double-deck V sets.

It is complemented by another service, The Chips and used to also run with The Summit and The Heron.

According to the current timetable, The Fish leaves Lithgow at 5:08am, reaches Mt Victoria at 5:37am and arrives Sydney at 7:47am. The Chips leaves Lithgow at 5:38am, reaches Mt Victoria at 6:07am and arrives Sydney at 8:17am.

References

Named passenger trains of New South Wales
Passenger rail transport in New South Wales